Sardari may refer to:

Sardari, Iran, now called Sardrud
 Sardar Iravani, Sardār-e Īravānī, title of governor of Yerevan
 Abdol Hossein Sardari, Iranian diplomat, who saved Jews from the holocaust
 Sardari Begum, 1996 Hindi movie